Kristína Košíková (born 20 December 1993) is a Slovak footballer who plays as a midfielder for Czech club Slovan Liberec and the Slovakia women's national team.

References

1993 births
Living people
Women's association football midfielders
Slovak women's footballers
Slovakia women's international footballers
Slovak expatriate footballers
Slovak expatriate sportspeople in the Czech Republic
Expatriate women's footballers in the Czech Republic
FK Slovan Duslo Šaľa (women) players
ŠK Slovan Bratislava (women) players
Czech Women's First League players